¿Quién quiere ser millonario? (English: Who wants to be a millionaire?) is a Mexican game show based on the original British format of Who Wants to Be a Millionaire?. The show was hosted by Pablo Latapí. As with most versions of the Millionaire franchise, the aim of the game is to win MX$3,000,000 (later $1,500,000) by answering fifteen multiple-choice general knowledge questions with four possible answers correctly. There are three lifelines in this version: 50:50, which removes two of the three incorrect answers; Phone-a-Friend, which gives the player 30 seconds to ask a nominated contact for assistance; and Ask the Audience, which allows the studio audience to input their thoughts into a keypad. ¿Quién quiere ser millonario? was broadcast from March 23, 2010, until 2012. It is shown on the public TV station Azteca 13.

Money tree

References

Who Wants to Be a Millionaire?
2010 Mexican television series debuts
Mexican game shows
2010s Mexican television series